Father of Darkness is a 1984 graphic text adventure video game by Central Solutions and published on the ZX Spectrum.

Playing like a text adventure with graphics, the plot sees Hitler taking possession of the sword of Excalibur during the time of King Arthur, with Merlin sending the player forward in time to the 1940s to defeat Hitler and retrieve the sword.

References

External links 
 

1980s interactive fiction
1984 video games
Cultural depictions of Adolf Hitler
Video games about time travel
Video games developed in the United Kingdom
ZX Spectrum-only games
ZX Spectrum games